The Elizabeth Female Academy, founded in 1818 in the town of Washington, was the first female educational institution in Mississippi. It was named after Mrs. Elizabeth Roach (later Greenfield), who donated the land on which the school was located.

History
The academy received its charter from the State Assembly on February 17, 1819.  The school was operated by Methodists, spiritual culture was emphasized over training for a profession.  The curriculum included chemistry, biology, natural and moral philosophy, botany and Latin, among other subjects. John James Audubon taught drawing there in May and June 1822.

The school closed in 1845, due in part to the relocation of the state capital from Natchez to Jackson, the general shift in the center of population, and several epidemics of yellow fever in the area.  The site was reduced to ruins by a fire in the late 1870s. Part of a brick wall is all that now remains of the Academy buildings.

The site of the Academy was entered on the National Register of Historic Places in 1977. A parking area with interpretive signs and a path to the ruins is located at mile marker 4.1 on the Natchez Trace Parkway.

Notable faculty and alumnae
 Varina Howell Davis

See also
 Jefferson College

References

1818 establishments in Mississippi
1845 disestablishments in Mississippi
Defunct private universities and colleges in Mississippi
Educational institutions established in 1818
Female seminaries in the United States
Former women's universities and colleges in the United States
History of women in Mississippi
University and college buildings on the National Register of Historic Places in Mississippi
Ruins in the United States
National Register of Historic Places in Adams County, Mississippi
University and college buildings completed in 1818
Educational institutions disestablished in 1845
Methodist schools in the United States
Methodism in Mississippi